Philip Visser (born 6 April 1998) is a South African cricketer. He made his List A debut on 22 December 2019, for Free State in the 2019–20 CSA Provincial One-Day Challenge. He made his first-class debut on 20 February 2020, for Free State in the 2019–20 CSA 3-Day Provincial Cup.

References

External links
 

1998 births
Living people
South African cricketers
Free State cricketers
Place of birth missing (living people)